Tripoux (or Tripous) is a dish made with small bundles of sheep tripe, usually stuffed with sheep's feet, sweetbreads and various herbs and garden vegetables.  There are a number of variations on this dish, but they generally all involve savoury ingredients held together with sheep tripe and braised over low heat.

See also

 List of lamb dishes
 List of stuffed dishes

References

French cuisine
Offal
Lamb dishes
Stuffed dishes